The 1988 Cal State Fullerton Titans football team represented California State University, Fullerton as a member of the Big West Conference during the 1988 NCAA Division I-A football season. Led by ninth-year head coach Gene Murphy, Cal State Fullerton compiled an overall record of 5–6 with a mark of 5–2 in conference play, placing second in the Big West. The Titans played their home games at Santa Ana Stadium in Santa Ana, California.

Schedule

Team players in the NFL
The following Cal State Fullerton players were selected in the 1989 NFL Draft.

References

Cal State Fullerton
Cal State Fullerton Titans football seasons
Cal State Fullerton Titans football